The Grand Prix du Disque for Blues is awarded by l'Académie Charles Cros.

Winners
The following is a partial list of winners:
 2002 Mighty Mo Rodgers Red, White and Blues
 2003 Buddy Guy for Blues Singers
 2004 Doctor John for N'Awlinz disdat or d'udda.<ref>"Grands Prix 2004 - 57ème Palmarès", l'Académie Charles Cros. Archived from [http://www.charlescros.org/pdf/palmares2004.pdf the

See also
Grand Prix du Disque

References

Blues